The following are the football (soccer) events of the year 1950 throughout the world.

Events
 Olympique Lyon is founded
 RoPS Rovaniemi is founded

Winners club national championship 
 : Racing Club
 : Bordeaux
 : VfB Stuttgart
 : KR
 : Juventus
 : Flamura Roșie Arad
 : Atlético Madrid
 : Fenerbahçe, Göztepe

International tournaments
1950 British Home Championship (October 1, 1949 – May 25, 1950)

 FIFA World Cup in Brazil (June 24 – July 16, 1950)

Births
 January 1 – Tony Currie, English footballer
 January 2 – Anatoli Ushanov, Russian footballer and coach (died 2017)
 January 13 – Gholam Hossein Mazloumi, Iranian international footballer and manager (died 2014)
 February 28 – Gerdo Hazelhekke, Dutch footballer
 April 3 –  Petar Nikezić, Yugoslavian-Serbian international footballer (died 2014)
 April 8 – Grzegorz Lato, Polish international footballer
 April 20 – Tommy Berggren, Swedish footballer (died 2012)
 May 1 – Danny McGrain, Scottish international footballer
 May 5 – Brian Alderson, Scottish footballer (died 1997)
 May 23 – Ken Tiler, English former professional footballer
 July 5 – Carlos Caszely, Chilean international footballer
 September 7 – Mário Sérgio Pontes de Paiva, Brazilian international footballer and manager (died 2016)
 October 3 – Luděk Macela, Czech international footballer (died 2016)
 October 24 –  Asa Hartford, Scottish international footballer
 November 29 – Dietmar Danner, German international footballer

Deaths

October
 October 5 – Juan Botasso, Argentine Goalkeeper, runner-up of the 1930 FIFA World Cup. (41)

References

 
Association football by year